Education in the Philippines is provided by public and private schools, colleges, universities, and technical and vocational institutions in the country. Funding for public education comes from the national government. For the academic year 2017–2018, about 83% of K–12 students attended public schools and about 17% either attended private schools or were home-schooled.

Three government agencies handle each level of education. At the basic education level, the Department of Education (DepEd) sets overall educational standards and mandates standardized tests for the K–12 basic education system, although private schools are generally free to determine their own curriculum in accordance with existing laws and Department regulations. At the higher education level, the Commission on Higher Education (CHED) supervises and regulates colleges and universities. Meanwhile, the Technical Education and Skills Development Authority (TESDA) regulates and accredits technical and vocational education programs and institutions in the country.

By law, education is compulsory for thirteen years (kindergarten and grades 1–12) and is grouped into three levels: kindergarten, elementary school (grades 1–6), junior high school (grades 7–10), and senior high school (grades 11–12). They may also be grouped into four key stages: 1st key stage (kindergarten–grade 3), 2nd key stage (grades 4–6), 3rd key stage (grades 7–10) and 4th key stage (grades 11–12). Children usually enter kindergarten at age 5.

Institutions of higher education may be classified as either public or private college or university; public institutions of higher education may further be subdivided into two types: state universities and colleges and local colleges and universities.

History

Pre-colonial period

During the pre-colonial period, most children were provided with solely vocational training, which was supervised by parents, tribal tutors or those assigned for specific, specialized roles within their communities (for example, the babaylan). In most communities, stories, songs, poetry, dances, medicinal practices and advice regarding all sorts of community life issues were passed from generation to generation mostly through oral tradition. Some communities utilized a writing system known as baybayin, whose use was wide and varied, though there are other syllabaries used throughout the archipelago.

Spanish period

Formal education was brought to the Philippines by the Spaniards, which was conducted mostly by religious orders. Upon learning the local languages and writing systems, they began teaching Christianity, the Spanish language, and Spanish culture. These religious orders opened the first schools and universities as early as the 16th century. Spanish missionaries established schools immediately after reaching the islands. The Augustinians opened a parochial school in Cebu in 1565. The Franciscans, took to the task of improving literacy in 1577, aside from the teaching of new industrial and agricultural techniques. The Jesuits followed in 1581, as well as the Dominicans in 1587, setting up a school in Bataan. The church and the school cooperated to ensure that Christian villages had schools for students to attend.

Schools for boys and for girls were then opened. Colegios were opened for boys, ostensibly the equivalent to present day senior high schools. The Universidad de San Ignacio, founded in Manila by the Jesuits in 1589 was the first colegio. Eventually, it was incorporated into the University of Santo Tomas, College of Medicine and Pharmacology following the suppression of the Jesuits. Girls had two types of schools – the beaterio, a school meant to prepare them for the convent, and another, meant to prepare them for secular womanhood.

The Spanish also introduced printing presses to produce books in Spanish and Tagalog, sometimes using baybayin. The first book printed in the Philippines dates back to 1590. It was a Chinese language version of Doctrina Christiana. Spanish and Tagalog versions, in both Latin script and the locally used baybayin script, were later printed in 1593. In 1610, Tomas Pinpin, a Filipino printer, writer and publisher, who is sometimes referred to as the "Patriarch of Filipino Printing", wrote his famous "Librong Pagaaralan nang manga Tagalog nang Uicang Castilla", which was meant to help Filipinos learn the Spanish language. The prologue read:

The Educational Decree of 1863 provided a free public education system in the Philippines, managed by the government. The decree mandated the establishment of at least one primary school for boys and one for girls in each town under the responsibility of the municipal government, and the establishment of a normal school for male teachers under the supervision of the Jesuits. Primary education was also declared free and available to every Filipino, regardless of race or social class. Contrary to what the propaganda of the Spanish–American War tried to depict and current popular media, they were not religious schools; rather, they are schools that were established, supported, and maintained by the Spanish government.

After the implementation of the decree, the number of schools and students increased steadily. In 1866, the total population of the Philippines was 4,411,261. The total number of public schools for boys was 841, and the number of public schools for girls was 833. The total number of children attending those schools was 135,098 for boys, and 95,260 for girls. In 1892, the number of schools had increased to 2,137, of which 1,087 were for boys, and 1,050 for girls. By 1898, enrollment in schools at all levels exceeded 200,000 students. There was some opposition to universal education from Spanish priests, and only 1.6% of the population gained more than a primary school education.

Among those who benefited from the free public education system were a burgeoning group of Filipino intellectuals: the Ilustrados ('enlightened ones'), some of whom included José Rizal, Graciano López Jaena, Marcelo H. del Pilar, Mariano Ponce, and Antonio Luna—all of whom played vital roles in the Propaganda Movement that ultimately inspired the founding of the Katipunan.

Some schools established during this period were founded by non-Spaniards and were therefore not colonial creations.  Damian Domingo, established in 1823 a fine arts school known as the Academia de Dibujo y Pintura, which is now the Fine Arts College of the University of the Philippines.  In 1868, Doña Margarita Roxas de Ayala, established the girls' school La Concordia.

First Republic
The defeat of Spain following the Spanish–American War led to the short-lived Philippine Independence movement, which established the First Philippine Republic. The schools maintained by Spain for more than three centuries were closed briefly, but were reopened on August 29, 1898, by the Secretary of Interiors. The Instituto Burgos (Burgos Institute), the Academia Militar (the country's first military academy), and the Universidad de Literaria de Filipinas (Literary University of the Philippines) were established. Article 23 of the Malolos Constitution mandated that public education would be free and obligatory in all schools of the nation under the First Philippine Republic. However, the Philippine–American War hindered its progress. Established in the American-occupied zone, Colegio Filipino (now National University) is a Philippine college which dates from this period which has survived to the present. There also existed for many decades the Rosa Sevilla Memorial School, which was originally founded on July 15, 1900, as the Instituto de Mujeres, an all-girls private school.

American period

About a year after having secured Manila, the Americans were keen to open up seven schools with army servicemen teaching with army command-selected books and supplies. In the same year, 1899, more schools were opened, this time, with 24 English-language teachers and 4500 students. In that system, basic education consisted of 6 years elementary and 4 years secondary schooling which, until recently, prepared students for tertiary level instruction for them to earn a degree that would secure them a job later on in life.

A highly centralized, experimental public school system was installed in 1901 by the Philippine Commission and legislated by Act No. 74. The law exposed a severe shortage of qualified teachers, brought about by large enrollment numbers in schools. As a result, the Philippine Commission authorized the Secretary of Public Instruction to bring more than 1,000 teachers from the United States, who were called the Thomasites, to the Philippines between 1901 and 1902. These teachers were scattered throughout the islands to establish barangay schools. The same law established the Philippine Normal School (now the Philippine Normal University) to train aspiring Filipino teachers. The high school system was supported by provincial governments and included special educational institutions, schools of arts and trades, an agricultural school, and commerce and marine institutes, which were established in 1902 by the Philippine Commission.

Several other laws were passed throughout the period. In 1902, Act No. 372 authorized the opening of provincial high schools. while in 1908, Act No. 1870 initiated the opening of the University of the Philippines, now the country's national university.

The emergence of high school education in the Philippines, however, did not occur until 1910. It was borne out of rising numbers in enrollment, widespread economic depression, and growing demand by big businesses and technological advances in factories and the emergence of electrification, and the growing need for skilled workers. In order to meet this new job demand, high schools were created, and the curriculum focused on practical job skills that would better prepare students for professional white-collar or skilled blue-collar work. This proved to be beneficial for both the employer and the employee; the investment in human capital caused employees to become more efficient, which lowered costs for the employer, and skilled employees received a higher wage than those employees with just primary educational attainment.

However, a steady increase in enrollment in schools appeared to have hindered any revisions to the then-implemented experimental educational system. Act No. 1801, also known as Gabaldon Law, was passed in 1907, which provided a fund of a million pesos for the construction of concrete school buildings and is one of many attempts by the government to meet this demand. Inline as well with the Filipinization policy of the government, the Reorganization Act of 1916 provided that all department secretaries except the Secretary of Public Instruction must be a natural-born Filipino.

A series of revisions (in terms of content, length, and focus) to the curriculum began in 1924, the year the Monroe Survey Commission released its findings. After having convened in the period from 1906 to 1918, what was simply an advisory committee on textbooks was officiated in 1921 as the Board on Textbooks through Act No. 2957. The Board was faced with difficulties, however, even up to the 1940s, but because financial problems hindered the possibility of newer adaptations of books.

The Moro Province originally had its own Department of Public Instruction, separate from the national system. Education rapidly expanded, with the number of teachers rising from 74 in 1904 to 239 by 1914. The number of schools rose from 52 in 1904 to 366 in 1920, with a corresponding increase in enrollment from 2114 to over 33,000. Such enrollment was primarily made up of first- and second-year students, after which attendance decreased. This increase also disproportionately benefited Christian inhabitants of the province, and most staff were Christians from elsewhere in the Philippine Islands. Perhaps less than 10% of Muslim children attended public schools in 1920, with attendance remaining low throughout the American period. Education was primarily in English, and aimed to introduce American values in the local population. The Department of Public Instruction moved under the control of the national Bureau of Education in 1915, and was fully integrated into the national system by 1922, part of a process of transferring government to local Filipinos as part of a pathway towards independence. Educational materials, when they began to incorporate stories and cultural aspects from the Philippines, represented the mainstream Christian narrative. Under the Commonwealth of the Philippines, the national curriculum served as a tool to inoculate a single national identity across the diverse ethnolinguistic groups of the archipelago.

Japanese period and Second Republic
During the Japanese occupation, education was used for indoctrinating the public to inculcate Japanese ideologies, causing low enrollment rates. The Japanese Military Administration's Order No. 2 of February 17, 1942, had six basic points: the propagation of Filipino culture; the dissemination of the principle of the Greater East Asia Co-Prosperity Sphere; the spiritual rejuvenation of the Filipinos; the teaching and propagation of Nippongo; the diffusion of vocational and elementary education; and "the promotion of the love of labor".

After having been closed following the outbreak of the Pacific War, elementary schools followed by vocational and normal schools reopened. Colleges offering courses in agriculture, medicine, fisheries, and engineering also resumed teaching, however, law courses were not instructed. Textbook passages concerning American ideologies of democracy were censored. Educational reforms required teachers to obtain licenses following rigid examinations. All heads of educational institutions were also required to obtain licenses. Also, the teaching of Tagalog, Philippine History, and character education was reserved for Filipinos.

The Japanese created the following educational institutions: the Training Institute, for former USAFFE soldiers; the Normal Institute; the Preparatory Institute of Government Scholars to Japan; the Government Employees Training Institute; the New Philippines Cultural Institute; Constabulary Academy No. 1, at the Mapa High School Building in Bagumpanahon; Constabulary Academy No. 2, at the former Araullo High School Building in Bagumbayan; Constabulary Academy No. 3 at the Torres High School Building in Bagumbuhay; and Constabulary Academy No. 4 at the Legarda Elementary School in Bagumpanahon. During this period the Philippine Nautical School, now known as the Philippine Merchant Marine Academy, remained in operation and its student population was even increased by the Japanese authorities. A school established during the Japanese period which still exists is St. Paul College of Makati.

Third to Fifth Republic 
The education sector of the country had undergone several changes throughout the years after the relinquishment of the United States of its authority all over the Philippines in 1947. Then President Manuel Roxas issued Executive Order No. 94 which renamed Department of Instruction into Department of Education with the regulation and supervision of public and private schools belonging to the Bureau of Public and Private Schools.

After the war, the public school system was rebuilt with the launching of the Philippine Community School program, which has received worldwide recognition. As early as 1953, the educational development in the Philippines drew attention from neighboring Asian countries, with several groups of Asian educators visiting the country to observe and study the vocational industrial schools.

Following independence Islamic schools began to spread in Mindanao, creating a parallel educational structure all the way up to higher education.

Under the Marcos administration, the Department of Education became the Department of Education and Culture and consequently Ministry of Education and Culture through Proclamation No. 1081 and Presidential Decree No. 1397, respectively.

The Education Act of 1982 provided for an integrated system of education covering both formal and non-formal education at all levels. Section 29 of the act sought to upgrade educational institutions' standards to achieve "quality education" through voluntary accreditation for schools, colleges, and universities. Section 16 and Section 17 upgraded the obligations and qualifications required for teachers and administrators. Section 41 provided for government financial assistance to private schools.

After the ratification of the 1987 constitution, the fundamental aims of education in the Philippines were defined and most importantly, elementary schooling was made compulsory for all children. Meanwhile, the enactment of the Free Public Secondary Education Act of 1988 or Republic Act 6655, mandated free public secondary education commencing in the school year 1988–1989.

In 1987, the Ministry of Education, Culture and Sports again became the Department of Education, Culture, and Sports under Executive Order No. 117 and remained practically unchanged until 1994.

According to the 1991 report by the Congressional Commission on Education (EDCOM), the department was recommended to be divided into three parts. Thus, the passage of the Republic Acts 7722 and 7796 in 1994 led the "trifocalization" of the educational system in the Philippines. Republic Act 7722 or the Higher Education Act of 1994 created the Commission on Higher Education (CHED), which assumed the functions of the Bureau of Higher Education and supervised tertiary degree programs Republic Act 7796 or the Technical Education and Skills Development Act of 1994, created the Technical Education and Skills Development Authority (TESDA), which absorbed the Bureau of Technical-Vocational Education as well as the National Manpower and Youth Council, and began to supervise non-degree technical-vocational programs. Meanwhile, the Department of Education, Culture, and Sports retained responsibility for all elementary and secondary education.

Contemporary period 
The start of the twenty-first century saw a major change in the Philippine education system. In August 2001, Republic Act 9155, otherwise called the Governance of Basic Education Act, was passed. This act changed the name of department to the current Department of Education (DepEd) and redefined the role of field offices (regional offices, division offices, district offices and schools). The act provided the overall framework for school empowerment by strengthening the leadership roles of headmasters and fostering transparency and local accountability for school administrations. The goal of basic education was to provide the school age population and young adults with skills, knowledge, and values to become caring, self-reliant, productive, and patriotic citizens.

In January 2009, the Department of Education signed a memorandum of agreement with the United States Agency for International Development (USAID) to seal $86 million assistance to Philippine education, particularly the access to quality education in the Autonomous Region in Muslim Mindanao (ARMM), and the Western and Central Mindanao regions.

In 2010, then-Senator Benigno Aquino III expressed his desire to implement the K–12 basic education cycle to increase the number of years of compulsory education to thirteen years. According to him, this will "give everyone an equal chance to succeed" and "have quality education and profitable jobs". 

After further consultations and studies, the Department of Education formally adopted the K-12 educational system—one year of kindergarten, six years of elementary education, four years of junior high school education and two years of senior high school education starting with School Year 2011–2012 on June 6, 2011 which also included a new curriculum for all schools nationwide. The K-12 program has a so-called "phased implementation", which started in SY 2011–2012. Although DepEd has already implemented the K–12 Program since SY 2011–2012, it was still enacted into law to guarantee its continuity in the succeeding years. Kindergarten was formally made compulsory by virtue of the Kindergarten Education Act of 2012, while the further twelve years were officially put into law by virtue of the Enhanced Basic Education Act of 2013. Due to the implementation of the K-12 curriculum, the process of phasing out the 1945–2012 system began on June 4, 2012 when the new curriculum was implemented on Grades 1 and 7 and the old system was entirely phased out on June 5, 2017 (during the administration of Benigno Aquino III's successor Rodrigo Duterte) upon the implementation of K-12 on Grade 6.

The Philippines had a simple literacy rate of 98.3% as of 2015, and a functional literacy rate of 90.3% as of 2013.

In 2017, the Universal Access to Quality Tertiary Education Act was signed by President Rodrigo Duterte mandating the government through all state universities and colleges (SUCs) to provide free tertiary education for all Filipino citizens. The mandate does not include private schools. However, certain subsidies for students enrolled in private higher education institutions are also available. In January 2021, the alternative learning system (ALS) was institutionalized by a law signed by President Duterte.

Educational stages 
Formal education is the hierarchically structured, chronologically graded 'education system', running from primary school through the university and including, in addition to general academic studies, a variety of specialized programs and institutions for full-time technical and professional training.

K-12 and tertiary education from colleges are characterized as formal education. This does not include the informal education in the Philippines learned from daily experience and the educative influences and resources in his or her environment nor alternative learning systems provided by the Department of Education (DepEd), Technical Education and Skills Development Authority (TESDA) and other programs from educational institutions.

Current education system 

The current education system in the Philippines is composed of kindergarten and 12 years of basic education, all of which are compulsory. Students also have the option to enroll in higher education programs to earn a baccalaureate degree.

The new system divided secondary education into two, with the high school from the former 1945–2012 system becoming junior high school, while senior high school encompassing the 11th and 12th year of the new educational system. It will serve as a specialized upper secondary education. In the senior high school, students may choose a specialization based on aptitude, interests, and school capacity. The choice of career track will define the content of the subjects a student will take in grades 11 and 12. Because of the shift of the curriculum, the General Education curriculum in college will have fewer units, as these subjects that have been taken up in Basic Education will be removed.

There were four phases during the implementation of the new system. These are Phase I: Laying the Foundations, which aimed to implement the universal kindergarten and the development of the program, Phase II: Modeling and Migration, which aimed to promote the enactment of the basic education law and to start of the phased implementation of the new curriculum for grades 1 to 10, and for the modeling of the senior high school, Phase III: Complete Migration, which aimed to finally implement the senior high school, and to signal the end of migration to the new educational system, and Phase IV: Completion of the Reform, where the complete the implementation of the K–12 education system

K-12's implementation began on June 6, 2011, when kindergarten became compulsory. Due to the implementation of K-12 curriculum, the process of phasing out the 1945 system began on June 4, 2012 when the new curriculum was implemented on Grades 1 and 7 (with the latter changing from First Year to Grade 7) and the old system was entirely phased out on June 5, 2017 upon the implementation of K-12 on Grade 6. The Department of Education's justifications in implementing 13 years of basic education, is that the Philippines is the only country in Asia and one of the four countries worldwide with a 10-year pre-university cycle (Angola, Djibouti and Myanmar), and that the 13-year program is found to be the best period for learning under basic education. It is also the recognized standard for students and professionals globally.

1945–2012 education system

The former system of basic education in the Philippines from 1945 to June 4, 2012, consisted of one-year non-compulsory preschool education, six-year compulsory elementary education and four-year compulsory high school education. Although public preschool, elementary and high school education are provided free, only primary education is stipulated as compulsory according to the 1987 Philippine Constitution. 

Pre-primary education caters to children aged five. A child aged six may enter elementary schools with, or without pre-primary education. Following on from primary education is four-years of secondary education, which can theoretically be further divided into three years of lower secondary and one year of upper secondary education. Ideally, a child enters secondary education at the age of 12. After completing their secondary education, students may progress to a technical education and skills development to earn a certificate or a diploma within one to three years, depending on the skill.

The 1945–2012 system was concurrently used with the K-12 curriculum from June 6, 2011 to June 5, 2017.

K–12 education 

K–12 education in the Philippines covers kindergarten and 12 years of basic education to provide sufficient time for mastery of concepts and skills, develop lifelong learners, and prepare graduates for tertiary education, middle-level skills development, employment, and entrepreneurship. Education is compulsory for all children, and free public education is provided for pre-elementary, elementary, and high school.

Schooling is divided into pre-elementary school, primary education, called elementary school, and secondary education, divided into junior high school and senior high school.

Pre-elementary 
In kindergarten, the pupils are mandated to learn the alphabet, numbers, shapes and colours through games, songs, pictures and dances, but in their native language; thus after grade 1, every student can read on his/her native tongue. The 12 original mother tongue languages that have been introduced for the 2012–2013 school year are Bicolano, Cebuano, Chavacano, Hiligaynon, Ilocano, Kapampangan, Maguindanaoan, Maranao, Pangasinense, Tagalog, Tausug and Waray-Waray. 7 more mother tongue languages have been introduced for the 2013–2014 school year. These are Aklanon, Ibanag, Ivatan, Kinaray-a, Sambal, Surigaonon and Yakan.

Primary education 

Elementary school, sometimes called primary school or grade school (Filipino: paaralang elementarya, sometimes mababang paaralan), is the first part of the educational system, and it includes the first six years of compulsory education (grades 1–6) after compulsory pre-school education called Kindergarten.

From Kindergarten until grade 3, students will be taught using their mother tongue, meaning the regional languages of the Philippines will be used in subjects (except Filipino and English) as a medium of instruction. Aside from being incorporated as a language of instruction, it is also a separate subject for grades 1–3. Meanwhile, the subject areas of English and Filipino are taught with a focus on "oral fluency". By grade 3, the subject areas of English and Filipino are gradually introduced as languages of instruction for other subjects. 

Prior to the adoption of the Mother Tongue-Based Multilingual Education (MTB-MLE) system in 2012, a bilingual policy was used, wherein the medium of instruction was to be Filipino for Filipino, Araling Panlipunan, Edukasyong Pangkatawan, Kalusugan at Musika and English for English, Science and Technology, Home Economics and Livelihood Education. In July 2009, the Department of Education moved to overcome the foreign language issue by ordering all elementary schools to move towards initial mother-tongue based instruction (grades 1–3), with Filipino and English languages are to be phased in as the language of instruction. A few private schools mainly catering to the elite include Spanish in their curriculum. In December 2007, President Gloria Macapagal Arroyo announced that Spanish would make a return as a mandatory subject in all Filipino schools starting in 2008, but this did not come into effect. International English language schools use English as the foundational language. Chinese schools add two language subjects, such as Min Nan Chinese and Mandarin Chinese and may use English or Chinese as the foundational language.

In public schools, the core subjects that are introduced starting in grade 1 include Mathematics, Filipino, and Araling Panlipunan (synonymous to Social studies); English is only introduced after the second semester of grade 1. Science is only introduced starting grade 3. The Science and Mathematics subjects use the spiral progression approach starting as early as grade 1, which means that every lesson will be taught in every grade level starting with the basic concepts to the more complex concepts of that same lesson until grade 10.

Other major subjects then include Mother Tongue (grades 1–3), Edukasyong Pantahanan at Pangkabuhayan (EPP) for grades 4 and 5 and Technology and Livelihood Education (TLE) for grade 6, Edukasyon sa Pagpapakatao (synonymous to Ethics, Values or Character Education), and Music, Arts, Physical Education, and Health (MAPEH). In private schools, subjects in public schools are also included with the additional subjects including: Computer Education as a separate subject, though it is included in EPP and TLE through its ICT component. In Christian and Catholic schools, Religious Education is also part of the curriculum. International schools also have their own subjects in their own language and culture.

Until 2004, primary students traditionally took the National Elementary Achievement Test (NEAT) administered by the Department of Education, Culture and Sports (DECS). It was intended as a measure of a school's competence, and not as a predictor of student aptitude or success in secondary school. Hence, the scores obtained by students in the NEAT were not used as a basis for their admission into secondary school. During 2004, when DECS was officially converted into the Department of Education, the NEAT was changed to the National Achievement Test (NAT) by the Department of Education. Both the public and private elementary schools take this exam to measure a school's competency. As of 2006, only private schools have entrance examinations for secondary schools.

Secondary education 
Secondary school in the Philippines, more commonly known as "high school" (Filipino: paaralang sekundarya, sometimes mataas na paaralan), consists of 4 lower levels and 2 upper levels. It formerly consisted of only four levels with each level partially compartmentalized, focusing on a particular theme or content. Because of the K-12 curriculum, the high school system now has six years divided into 2 parts. The lower exploratory high school system is now called junior high school (grades 7–10) while the upper specialized high school system is now called senior high school (grades 11 and 12). In addition, there are also science secondary schools for students who have demonstrated a particular gift in science at the primary level as well as special secondary schools and special curricular programs.

Junior high school 
Students graduating from the elementary level automatically enroll in junior high, which covers four years from grades 7 to 10. This level is now compulsory and free to all students attending public schools. There are two main types of high school: the general secondary school, which enroll more than 90 percent of all junior high school students, and the vocational secondary school.  The Department of Education specifies a compulsory curriculum for all junior high school students, public and private. There are five core subjects: Science, Mathematics, English, Filipino, and Araling Panlipunan (Social Studies).

Admission to public school is automatic for those who have completed six years of elementary school. Some private secondary schools have competitive entrance requirements based on an entrance examination. Entrance to science schools, art schools, and schools with special curricular programs is also by competitive examination sometimes including interviews, and auditions.

Other subjects in all levels of junior high school include MAPEH (a collective subject comprising Music, Art, Physical Education and Health), Character Education (Edukasyon sa Pagpapakatao) and Technology and Livelihood Education (TLE).

In other public schools or private secondary schools offers specialized curricular programs for students with gifts and or talents as well as aptitude in fields of: sciences and mathematics, sports, the arts, journalism, foreign language, or technical-vocational education. These are under the DepEd with the latter in partnership with TESDA. These special programs for special schools are: Science, Technology, Engineering, and Mathematics Program (STEM, formerly called ESEP); Special Program in Sports (SPS); Special Program in the Arts (SPA); Special Program in Journalism (SPJ); Special Program in Foreign Language (SPFL); and Technical-Vocational-Livelihood Program (TVL). These programs offer comprehensive secondary education in a particular academic or career pathway field. Because of being career-pathway oriented, special and advanced subjects are offered in replace of TLE subject and sometimes includes even more time and subjects for specialized learning and training.

In selective schools, various languages may be offered as electives like in an SPFL program, as well as other subjects such as computer programming and literary writing like in STEM schools or Laboratory High Schools. Chinese schools have language and cultural electives. International Schools offer electives or subjects like writing, culture, history, language, art, or a special subject unique to the school. Preparatory schools like technical vocational schools or schools with TVL Programs usually add some business, entrepreneurship, and accountancy courses.

In a special government-run art school such as Philippine High School for the Arts, which is administered by the Cultural Center of the Philippines in coordination with the Department of Education, and as well as the National Commission for Culture and the Arts offers a much specialized and exclusive curricular program than a general high school's SPA program. Students from PHSA must maintain grades in their art field of specialization to continue studying in the institution. Only SPA students can enroll in PHSA for the second year, after passing the exclusive test, auditions, and interviews. These schools offer scholarships for students with high aptitude and talents in science fields or the art fields granting those who pass rigorous and exclusive tests with many special benefits like free board and lodging, free books, a monthly stipend, and classes taught by experts, masters, and active practitioners of their respective fields among others.

Senior high school 
Senior high school "completes" basic education by making sure that the high school graduate is equipped for work, entrepreneurship, or higher education. The senior high school curriculum includes core classes and specialization classes based on student choice of specialization. Students may choose a specialization based on aptitude, interests, and school capacity. Classes or courses are divided into two: Core Curriculum Subjects and Track Subjects. All subjects (core, applied and specialized) have 80 hours per semester each, except for Physical Education and Health, having 20 hours per semester.

Senior high school will be offered free in public schools and there will be a voucher program in place for public junior high school completers as well as ESC beneficiaries of private high schools should they choose to take Senior High School in private institutions. This means that the burden of expenses for the additional two years need not be completely shouldered by parents. All grade 10 completers from a public junior high school who wish to enroll in a private senior high school will automatically get a voucher.

There are eight learning areas under the core curriculum. Core curriculum learning areas include languages, humanities, communication, physical education, mathematics, philosophy, natural sciences and social sciences. These will make up 15 core courses with the same contents and competencies but with allowed contextualization based on school's location despite of specializations of tracks and strands. Track subjects will be further divided into Applied or Contextualized Subjects and the Specialization Subjects. There would be 7 Applied Subjects with competencies common to tracks and strands or specializations but with different contents based on specialization, and there would be 9 Specialization Subjects with unique contents and competencies under a track or strand. Applied subjects include English for Academic and Professional Purposes, Practical Research 1, Practical Research 2, Pagsulat sa Filipino sa Piling Larangan, Empowerment Technologies, Entrepreneurship, and the Research Project.

Tracks 
For their specialization classes, students choose from four tracks: Academic; Technical-Vocational-Livelihood; Sports; and the Arts and design. The Academic track includes five strands of specializations:

 Accountancy and Business Management (ABM) which will prepare students for college courses in the business-related careers such as accountancy, business management, business administration, office management, economics, or entrepreneurship.
 Humanities and Social Sciences (HUMSS) which will prepare students to college courses in the fields of humanities like languages, mass communication and journalism, literature, philosophy, history, education, liberal arts, and the rest of humanities and social sciences.
 Science and Technology, Engineering, and Mathematics (STEM) which will prepare students for college courses in the fields of basic and applied sciences, biological sciences, physical sciences, laboratory sciences, nutrition and allied medicine, mathematics, and engineering.
 General Academic (GA) is a generic strand for students who are not yet sure of what to study in college or what track and strand to take with a freedom to choose electives from any track or strand offered by the school.
 The new Pre-Baccalaureate Maritime Strand which is an academic maritime field preparatory strand with pre-engineering courses lie pre-calculus, calculus, and physics as well as one chemistry and introductory maritime courses, preparing students who wishes to pursue higher education in a maritime-related field.

The Technical-Vocational-Livelihood (TVL) track includes current five specializations from which TESDA-based courses can be chosen: Home Economics, Agri-Fishery Arts, Industrial Arts, Information and Communications Technology, and TVL Maritime (a Technical-Vocational-Livelihood counterpart of the Pre-Baccalaureate Maritime of Academic Track). A mixture of specialization courses from these four fields can also be done, depending on the curricular program and offerings offered by schools who offers TVL track.

The Sports track will prepare students with sports science, sports-related, physical education-related, health-related, and movement-related courses. This will be with courses in safety and first aid, fitness testing and basic exercise programming, psychosocial aspects of sports and exercise, and human movement. This track will prepare students with careers in sports athletics, fitness, exercise, recreational leadership, sports event management, coaching, and physical therapy.

The Arts and design track will prepare student for the creative industries in various creative and artistic fields such as but not limited performing arts and visual arts. Students will be trained with lectures and immersions in arts appreciation and production and the performing arts. They will also learn and be prepared with physical and personal development, integration of elements and principles of art, and building cultural and national identity in arts. Students also will be immersed to an art field of their choice.

Vocational school 

Formal technical and vocational education starts at secondary education, with a two-year curriculum, which grants access to vocational tertiary education. [35] However, there is also non-formal technical and vocational education provided as alternative learning programs.

Vocational schools offer a higher concentration of technical and vocational subjects in addition to the core academic subjects studied by students at general high schools. These schools tend to offer technical and vocational instruction in one of five main fields: agriculture, fisheries, trade-technical, home industry, and ‘non-traditional’ courses while offering a host of specializations. During the first two years, students study a general vocational area, from the five main fields mentioned. During the third and fourth years they specialize in a discipline or vocation within that area. Programs contain a mixture of theory and practice.

Upon completion of grade 10 of Junior High School, students can obtain Certificates of Competency (COC) or the vocationally oriented National Certificate Level I (NC I). After finishing a Technical-Vocational-Livelihood track in grade 12 of Senior High School, a student may obtain a National Certificate Level II (NC II), provided he/she passes the competency-based assessment administered by TESDA.

Science high schools 

Science high schools are special schools for the more intellectually promising students, with the objective of fostering the problem-solving approach of critical thinking. They are separate high schools and not merely special classes in regular secondary schools. As such, they have certain characteristics not found in regular high schools, although any private or public high school can aspire to meet these special minimum standards and be considered as science high schools. These science schools are more exclusive and have higher standards compared to general high schools.

Special science high schools like those of the Philippine Science High School System administered by DOST and the RSHS System administered by DepEd have biology, chemistry, and physics at every level and or exclusive and advanced science and math subjects as well as subjects in technology, pre-engineering, and research.  PSHS or RSHS students may transfer to a STEM program school but not the way around. PSHS students may also transfer to an RSHS and vice versa only for the incoming sophomore year. Both PSHS and RSHS students must maintain an average grade especially in their advanced sciences and math subjects on a quarterly basis or to continue their education in these schools.

Students who successfully completed a minimum of four years of secondary education under the pre-2011 system were awarded a Diploma (Katibayan) and, in addition, the secondary school Certificate of Graduation (Katunayan) from the Department of Education. Students are also awarded a Permanent Record, or Form 137-A, listing all classes taken and grades earned. Under the new K-12 system, the permanent record will be issued after the completion of senior high school.

Other types of schools 
There are other types of schools, aside from the general public school, such as private schools, preparatory schools, international schools, laboratory high schools, and science high schools. Several foreign ethnic groups, including Chinese, British, Singaporeans, Americans, Koreans, and Japanese operate their own schools.

Chinese schools 

Chinese schools add two additional subjects to the core curriculum, Chinese communication arts and literature. Some also add Chinese history, philosophy and culture, and Chinese mathematics. Other Chinese schools, called cultural schools, offer Confucian classics and Chinese art as part of their curriculum. Religion also plays an important part in the curriculum. American evangelists founded some Chinese schools, while some Chinese schools have Catholic roots.

Islamic schools 
In 2004, the Department of Education adopted Department Order No. 51, establishing the inclusion of Arabic Language and Islamic Values in the standard curriculum for Muslim children in public schools. The same order authorized the implementation of the Standard Madrasa Curriculum (SMC) in the private madaris. The SMC is a combination of the RBEC subjects (English, Filipino, Science, Math, and Makabayan) and the teaching of Arabic and Islamic studies subjects. Islamic schools have a separate subject for Arabic Language and for Islamic Values (ALIVE). Arabic is taught in Islamic schools.

While there has been recognized Islamic schools—i.e., Ibn Siena Integrated School (Marawi), Sarang Bangun LC (Zamboanga), and Southwestern Mindanao Islamic Institute (Jolo)—their Islamic studies curriculum varies. With the Department of Education-authorized SMC, the subject offering is uniform across these private madaris.

Since 2005, the AusAID-funded Department of Education project Basic Education Assistance for Mindanao (BEAM) has assisted a group of private madaris seeking government permit to operate (PTO) and implement the SMC.

Higher education 

Tertiary education matters are outside of the jurisdiction of DepEd and is instead governed by the Commission on Higher Education (CHED). , there are over 1,975 higher education institutions (HEIs) in the country (excluding satellite campuses of state universities and colleges) which can be divided into public and private institutions.

Public HEIs are further divided into state universities and colleges (SUCs), local colleges and universities (LUCs), and Other Government Schools (OGS, CSI [CHED Supervised Institution], Special HEIs). State universities and colleges are administered and financed by the government as determined by the Philippine Congress. LUCs are established by the local government units that govern the area of the LUC. The local government establish these institutions through a process and number of ordinances and resolutions, and are also in charge of handling the financing of these schools. Special HEIs are institutions that offer courses and programs that are related to public service. Examples of these include the Philippine Military Academy (PMA), Philippine National Police Academy (PNPA), and the Development Academy of the Philippines (DAP). These institutions are controlled and administered through the use of specific laws that were created for them. Finally, government schools are public secondary and post-secondary technical-vocational education institutions that offer higher education programs.

Private HEIs are established, and governed by special provisions by a Corporation Code, and can be divided into sectarian and non-sectarian. Non-sectarian are characterized by being owned and operated by private entities that have no affiliation with religious organizations; while sectarian HEIs are non-profit institutions that are owned and operated by a religious organization.

According to the last CHED published statistics on its website, there were 7,766 foreign nationals studying in various higher education institutions in the Philippines as of 2011–2012. Koreans were the top foreign nationals studying in the country with 1,572. The rest were Iranian, Chinese, American and Indian.

Secondary students used to sit for the National Secondary Achievement Test (NSAT), which was based on the American SAT and was administered by the Department of Education. Like its primary school counterpart, NSAT was phased out after major reorganizations in the education department. Its successors, the National Career Assessment Examination (NCAE) and National Achievement Test (NAT) were administered to 3rd and 4th Year students respectively, before the implementation of the K-12 system. The National Career Assessment Examination (NCAE) is now being administered for grade 9 and the National Achievement Test (NAT) is being administered at grades 3, 6, 10, and 12. Neither the NSAT nor NAT have been used as a basis for being offered admission to higher education institutions, partly because pupils sit them at almost the end of their secondary education. Instead, higher education institutions, both public and private, administer their own entrance examinations. Vocational colleges usually do not have entrance examinations.

Alternative Learning System 

The alternative learning system in the Philippines caters to the needs of those unable to access formal education or those that have not received proper education from formal education institutions for various reasons. According to DepEd, ALS is a laddered and modular non-formal education program for dropouts in elementary and secondary schools. The program enables students to attend classes according to their desired timetables, especially for those who are currently employed.

Although similar to formal teaching institutions, there will be a diagnostic test for everyone that will participate in order to gauge the level they are at in terms of the skills needed per grade level. If there are people that do not have the basic skills, such as reading and writing, there will be an additional program that will help them first learn the basics before taking the diagnostic test. There will be a specific number of hours that is required of the student in order for him/her to be able to finish the program. There will be a final assessment to test the comprehensive knowledge of the student. If the student passes, he/she will be given a certificate that is signed by the secretary of the department of education allowing the student to apply for college degrees, work, formal training programs, and can re-enroll in elementary/secondary education in formal teaching institutions.

Non-formal technical and vocational education is assumed by institutions usually accredited and approved by TESDA: center-based programs, community-based programs and enterprise-based training, or the Alternative Learning System (ALS). These institutions may be government operated, often by a local government, or private. They may offer programs ranging in duration from a couple of weeks to two-year diploma courses. Upon graduating from most of these courses, students take an examination from TESDA to obtain the relevant certificate or diploma.

Issues 

Most of the Philippines faces challenging issues when it comes to the educational system. The education system struggles with policy implementation and many government schools lack classroom space, textbooks, desks and learning equipment such as libraries, computers and science laboratories. The majority of government schools are run in two or three shifts, with large class sizes. These bureaucratic weaknesses are compounded by a local context of political and socio-religious tensions and a high rate of school principal turnover.

The Human Rights Measurement Initiative (HRMI) finds that the Philippines is fulfilling 79.0% of what it should be fulfilling for the right to education based on the country's level of income. HRMI breaks down the right to education by looking at the rights to both primary education and secondary education. While taking into consideration the Philippines' income level, the nation is achieving 87.8% of what should be possible based on its resources (income) for primary education but only 70.2% for secondary education.

Affordability 
A prevalent issue the Philippine educational system continuously encounters is the affordability of education. A big disparity in educational achievements is evident across various social groups. Socioeconomically disadvantaged students, otherwise known as students who are members of high and low-income poverty-stricken families, have higher drop-out rates in the elementary level.

Mismatch 
There is a large mismatch between educational training and actual jobs. This stands to be a major issue at the tertiary level, and it is furthermore the cause of the continuation of a substantial amount of educated yet unemployed or underemployed people.

Brain drain 
Brain drain is a persistent problem evident in the educational system of the Philippines, due to the modern phenomenon of globalization, with the number of Overseas Filipino Workers (OFWs) who worked abroad at any time during the period April to September 2014 estimated at 2.3 million. This ongoing mass emigration subsequently induces brain drain alongside grave economic implications.

See also
Main links
Distance e-Learning in the Philippines
Higher education in the Philippines
List of universities and colleges in the Philippines
List of Catholic universities and colleges in the Philippines
List of the oldest schools in the Philippines
Aiducation

Categories
:Category:Filipino educators
:Category:Medical schools in the Philippines
:Category:Graduate schools in the Philippines
:Category:Law schools in the Philippines
:Category:Liberal arts colleges in the Philippines
:Category:Business schools in the Philippines
:Category:Private universities and colleges in the Philippines
:Category:Military education and training in the Philippines

References

Further reading

owwa scholarship

External links
Department of Education
World Data on Education, UNESCO-IBE (2011) – overview of the education system
TVET in the Philippines, UNESCO-UNEVOC (2014) – overview of the technical and vocational education system